Sabbie Heesh (born 16 December 1991) is an English field hockey player who plays as a goalkeeper for Surbiton and the England and Great Britain national teams.

Club career
She plays club hockey in the Women's England Hockey League Premier Division for Surbiton.

She has also played club hockey for Leicester, Loughborough Students, Bowdon & Hightown, Cannock and Belper.

References

External links

1991 births
Living people
English female field hockey players
Female field hockey goalkeepers
Women's England Hockey League players
Cannock Hockey Club players
Loughborough Students field hockey players
Surbiton Hockey Club players
Field hockey players at the 2022 Commonwealth Games
Commonwealth Games gold medallists for England
Commonwealth Games medallists in field hockey
Medallists at the 2022 Commonwealth Games